Praja Parishad may refer to:
 Jammu Praja Parishad (1947–1963), a former political party in the Indian-administered Jammu and Kashmir
 Nepal Praja Parishad (1939–1940), a former political party in Nepal